The 2015 IHF Emerging Nations Championship was the first edition of the IHF Emerging Nations Championship, organised by the International Handball Federation (IHF). The tournament was held in Pristina and Gjakova, Kosovo, from 20 to 26 June.

A total of 16 nations played in the tournament: several European teams that did not qualify to the 2014 European Men's Handball Championship, plus Australia, Cameroon, China and Uruguay.

Referees
Following eight referee pairs are selected:

Venues
The championship were played at two venues in Pristina and Gjakova in Kosovo.

Preliminary round
The top two teams from each group advanced to the knockout stage.

Tie-breaking criteria
For the group stage of this tournament, where two or more teams in a group tied on an equal number of points, the finishing positions will be determined by the following tie-breaking criteria in the following order:
 number of points obtained in the matches among the teams in question
 goal difference in the matches among the teams in question
 number of goals scored in the matches among the teams in question (if more than two teams finish equal on points)
 goal difference in all the group matches
 number of goals scored in all the group matches
 drawing of lots

Group A

Group B

Group C

Group D

Knockout stage

Championship

5th place bracket

9th place bracket

13th place bracket

Quarterfinals

Semifinals

Third place game

Final

Final ranking

Awards
MVP:  Tróndur Kragesteen
Goalkeeper:  Isaac Junior Fonsho
Left Wing:  Rosing Rasmussen
Right Wing:  Karl Roosna
Center:  Kreshnik Krasniqi kosovo 
Left Back:  Raimonds Trifanovs
Right Back:  Áki Egilsnes
Pivot:  Jupa Kastriot
Top Goal Scorer:  Svetlin Dimitrov

Media coverage
RTV21 streams all Kosovo matches and both final and 3rd place matches.

See also
 2015 World Men's Handball Championship

References

External links
Official website
IHF website
Match Centre - Handball Australia webpage 
Match report - Australia vs Faroe Islands, Handball Australia webpage
Match Report - Kosovo vs Australia, Handball Australia webpage
Match report - Australia vs Armenia, Handball Australia webpage

IHF Emerging Nations Championship
IHF Emerging Nations Championship
IHF Emerging Nations Championship
Sports competitions in Kosovo
Handball in Kosovo